Israel "Isra" García Montero (born 29 January 2004) is a Spanish footballer who plays as an attacking midfielder for AD Alcorcón.

Club career
Born in Leganés, Community of Madrid, García played for CDF Lugo Fuenlabrada, Atlético Madrid and Rayo Vallecano as a youth, before joining AD Alcorcón's Juvenil side in August 2021. On 13 February 2022, before even appearing with the reserves, he made his professional debut by coming on as a second-half substitute for Borja Valle in a 0–2 Segunda División home loss against CD Tenerife.

References

External links
AD Alcorcón profile 

2004 births
Living people
People from Leganés
Spanish footballers
Footballers from the Community of Madrid
Association football midfielders
Segunda División players
Tercera Federación players
AD Alcorcón footballers
AD Alcorcón B players